Jeff Lozon, CC was the president and CEO of St. Michael's Hospital in Toronto from 1992 to 2009. In June 2009, Lozon assumed the duties of president and CEO of Revera, a provider of seniors' accommodation and services.

On 23 November 2006, he was named the chair of the Canadian Partnership Against Cancer by Prime Minister Stephen Harper.

In 2009, Lozon was named to the Order of Canada.

Lozon has in the past served as Ontario's deputy minister of health and long-term care and as chair of Canada Health Infoway.

Sources
 The cancer-slayer

People from Toronto
Living people
Year of birth missing (living people)
Members of the Order of Canada